No. 51 Squadron "Sword Arms" is a fighter squadron of the Indian air force, based in Srinagar Air Force Station. The squadron is under the western command of Indian Air Force.

History
No.51 Squadron was initially raised in AFS Chandigarh in 1985, then being equipped with Mig-21 Type 75 variant which later went on to be upgraded to the Mig-21 Bison variant. The squadron was shortly relocated to AFS Srinagar.

The squadron was number-plated by 30 September, 2022.

Notable Incidents
On 27 February 2019, the squadron was scrambled to intercept an intrusion by Pakistan aircraft into Jammu and Kashmir. Among the intercepting aircraft, was Wing Commander Abhinandan Varthaman's MiG-21. In the dogfight that ensued, he crossed into Pakistan territory where he was struck by a missile. Varthaman ejected and descended safely in the village of Horran in Pakistan administered Kashmir, approximately 7 km from the Line of Control.

It was claimed by local villagers that Varthaman could be identified as an Indian pilot by the Indian flag on his parachute. Upon landing, Varthaman asked the villagers if he was in India. The locals responded with pro-Pakistan slogans, after which Varthaman began to run while firing warning shots. He ran for approximately 500 metres, to a small pond, where he attempted to sink and swallow some of his documents. Subsequently, he was captured and manhandled by the villagers before being captured by the Pakistan Army.

Later that day, the Indian Ministry of External Affairs stated that an Indian pilot was missing in action after a MiG-21 Bison fighter plane was lost while engaging with Pakistani jets.

 A statement released by the IAF also said that prior to his MiG's crashing, he had managed to shoot down a PAF Lockheed Martin F-16. In a media briefing on 2 March 2019, nearly two days after the aerial engagement between PAF and IAF, the IAF displayed the parts of AIM-120 AMRAAM missiles which could be used only by the PAF's Lockheed Martin F-16.They also claimed that they had identified the electronic signatures of the aircraft and confirmed that it was the Lockheed Martin F-16 that was used. According to an agreement between the US and Pakistan, Pakistan is allowed to use the Lockheed Martin F-16 against terrorism only. Pakistan's Inter-Services Public Relations Director General refuted the later claims and asserted that F-16s were not used.

Aircraft

References

051